The 1983 Mediterranean Games football tournament was the 9th edition of the Mediterranean Games men's football tournament. The football tournament was held in Casablanca, Morocco between 9 and 17 September 1983 as part of the 1983 Mediterranean Games and was contested by 9 teams.

Participating teams
Nine teams took part in the tournament.

Squads

Venues

Tournament
All times local : Time zone (UTC+0)

Group stage
Morocco, Egypt and Turkey qualified for semifinals. France won the fourth semifinal place on lots.

Group A

Group B

Group C

Knockout stage

Semi-finals

Third place match

Final

Tournament classification

References

1983
Sports at the 1983 Mediterranean Games
1983 in African football
1983 in Asian football
1983